Verboom is a surname. Notable people with the surname include:

Adriaen Hendriksz Verboom (1627–1673), Dutch painter
Bryan Verboom (born 1992), Belgian footballer
Hanna Verboom (born 1983), Dutch actress

See also
Marquis of Verboom (1665–1744), Flemish military engineer